Pukeh Abbas (also Romanized as Pūkeh ʿAbbās) is a village in Ozgoleh Rural District, Ozgoleh District, Salas-e Babajani County, Kermanshah Province, Iran. At the 2006 census, its population was 42, in 8 families.

References 

Populated places in Salas-e Babajani County